Lambert is an English and French given name and surname. It is from the Low German form of the anthroponymic name Landberht from the Old High German land "(home) land" and beraht "bright".

It is one of the most common French surnames with a total number of birth in France between 1966 and 1990 around 18,000 births. variant forms include: Lamberty, Lambertot, Lamberton.

Geographical distribution
As of 2014, 36.1% of all known bearers of the surname Lambert were residents of the United States (frequency 1:3,039), 26.4% of France (1:765), 8.5% of England (1:1,983), 7.3% of Canada (1:1,533), 4.9% of Belgium (1:705), 2.8% of Australia (1:2,604), 2.4% of Nigeria (1:22,741), 1.5% of Germany (1:16,231) and 1.4% of South Africa (1:12,113).

In Belgium, the frequency of the surname was higher than national average (1:705) only in one region: Wallonia (1:296).

In France, the frequency of the surname was higher than national average (1:765) in the following regions:
 1. Bourgogne-Franche-Comté (1:447)
 2. Pays de la Loire (1:508)
 3. Grand Est (1:560)
 4. Normandy (1:573)
 5. Centre-Val de Loire (1:661)
 6. Guadeloupe (1:670)
 7. French Guiana (1:677)
 8. Hauts-de-France (1:715)

People with the given name 
 Lambert, Bishop of Ostia (c. 1036–1130), became Pope Honorius II
 Lambert, Margrave of Tuscany (fl. 929–931), also count and duke of Lucca
 Lambert (pianist) (fl. 2014), stage name of German pianist Paul Lambert
 Lambert le Bègue, 12th century Belgian priest
 Lambert de Monte, also known as Lambert of Cologne (1430/5–1499), Dutch scholastic and Thomist
 Lambert of Ardres, (c. 1160–after 1203) 12th century French chronicler
 Lambert of Cologne, also known as Lambert de Monte (1430/5–1499), Dutch scholastic and thomist
 Lambert of Gallura (d. 1225), giudice of Gallura, Sardinia
 Lambert of Hersfeld (c. 1024–c. 1088), Thuringian chronicler
 Lambert of Maastricht (c. 636 – c. 700), bishop, saint, and martyr
 Lambert of St-Bertin or Lambert of St-Omer (born c. 1060), medieval encyclopedist
 Lambert I of Leuven (c. 950–1015), count of Leuven
 Lambert II, Count of Leuven (1041–1063), count of Leuven
 Lambert I of Nantes (fl. 818–836), count of Nantes and duke of Spolete
 Lambert II of Nantes (fl. 843–851), count of Nantes
 Lambert III of Nantes (fl. 851–862), pretender to the County of Nantes
 Lambert I of Spoleto (d. 880), duke and margrave of Spoleto
 Lambert II of Spoleto (c. 880–898), Holy Roman Emperor
 Lambert II, Count of Lens (d. 1054), count of Lens
 Lambert Adelot (b. 1898), Belgian field hockey player
 Lambert Amon Tanoh (b. 1926), Ivorian politician
 Lambert Bartak, American organist
 Lambert Beauduin (1873–1960), Belgian monk, founder of Chevetogne Abbey, Belgium
 Lambert Blackwell Larking (1797–1868), English clergyman and antiquarian
 Lambert Bos (1670–1717), Dutch scholar
 Lambert Cadwalader (1742–1823), American merchant
 Lambert Croux (1927–2020), Belgian politician
 Lambert Daneau (c.1535–c.1590), French jurist and Calvinist theologian
 Lambert Ferri (fl. c. 1250–1300), trouvère and cleric at the monastery at Saint-Léonard, Pas-de-Calais
 Lambert Folkers (d. 1761), Nova Scotia politician
 Lambert Grimaldi (1420–1494), Lord of Monaco
 Lambert Hamel (b. 1940), German actor
 Lambert Heinrich von Babo (1818–1899), German chemist
 Lambert Hillyer (1889–1969), American director and screenwriter
 Lambert Hitchcock (1795–1852), American furniture manufacturer
 Lambert Lombard (1505–1566), painter and architect from the Low Countries
 Lambert Mascarenhas, 20th century Indian journalist
 Lambert McKenna (1870–1956), Irish scholar, editor and lexicographer
 Lambert Meertens (b. 1944), Dutch computer scientist
 Lambert Murphy (b. 1885), American tenor
 Lambert Quetelet (1796–1874), alternate name of Adolphe Quételet, Belgian astronomer, mathematician, statistician and sociologist
 Lambert Redd (1908–1986), American athlete
 Lambert Schaus (1908–1976), Luxembourgian politician
 Lambert-Sigisbert Adam (1700–1759), French sculptor
 Lambert Simnel (c. 1477–c. 1525), child pretender to the throne of England
 Lambert Sustris (c. 1515–20–c. 1584), Dutch painter
 Lambert van Nistelrooij (b. 1953), Dutch politician
 Lambert of Vence (1084–1154), Bishop and saint
 Lambert Verdonk (b. 1944), Dutch football player
 Sir Lambert Ward, 1st Baronet (1875–1956), British politician
 Lambert Wickes (1735–1777), American Continental Navy Captain
 Lambert Wilson (born 1958), French actor

People with the surname

A
 Adam Lambert (b. 1982), American recording artist, stage actor
 Adelaide Lambert (1907–1996), American swimmer
 Adrian Lambert (b. 1972), English bassist and songwriter
 Adrien Lambert (1913–2003), Canadian politician
 Alain Lambert (b. 1946), French politician
 Albert Bond Lambert (1875–1946), American aviator
 Albert Edward Lambert (1870–1929), British architect
 Alice Elinor Lambert (1886–1981), American writer
 Alison Lambert (b. 1977), British clarinetist
 Allen Lambert (1911–2002), Canadian banker
 Andrew Lambert (b. 1951), English historian
 Angela Lambert (1940–2007), British journalist
 Ann Lambert (b. 1957), Canadian playwright and author
 Anne Louise Lambert (b. 1955), Australian actress
 Anne-Thérèse de Marguenat de Courcelles, Marquise de Lambert (1647–1733), French writer
 Annie Lambert (b. 1946), British actress
 Sir Anthony Lambert (1911–2007), British ambassador
 August Lambert (1916–1945), German Luftwaffe fighter ace
 Aylmer Bourke Lambert (1761–1842), British botanist

B
 Benjamin Lambert (1937–2014), American optometrist and politician
 Bob Lambert (cricketer) (1874–1956), Irish cricketer
 Bob Lambert (academic) (born 1952), English member of the Special Demonstration Squad and academic
 Bob Lambert (executive) (c. 1957–2012), American media executive with The Walt Disney Company
 Brad Lambert (American football) (b. 1965), American football coach
 Brian Lambert (footballer, born 1936) (1936–2007), English footballer

C
 Cecil Lambert, (1864–1928) British admiral
 Charles de Lambert (disambiguation), any of several people of the same name
 Charles Lambert (disambiguation)
 Charles Lucien Lambert (1828–1896), American composer
 Chris Lambert (disambiguation)
 Christophe Lambert (disambiguation)
 Christopher Lambert (disambiguation)
 Claude Lambert (b. 1969), Canadian boxer
 Clayton Lambert (b. 1952), Guyana cricketer
 Cliff Lambert, English rugby league footballer of the 1940s, 1950s and 1960s
 Cody Lambert (b. 1961), American rodeo rider
 Constant Lambert (1905–1951), British composer
 Craig Lambert (b. 1968), Australian rules footballer

D
 Dan Lambert (b. 1970), Canadian ice hockey player
 Daniel Lambert (1770–1809), British prison keeper, famous for his obesity
 David Lambert (disambiguation), any of several people with this name
 Denis Lambert (b. 1961), Canadian boxer
 Denny Lambert (b. 1970), Canadian ice hockey player
 Derek Lambert, British writer
 Diane Lambert, American statistician
 Dion Lambert (born 1969), American football player
 Donald Lambert (1904–1962), American jazz stride pianist
 Dorothea Lambert Chambers (1878–1960), British tennis player

E
 E. M. Lambert (1905–2000), American college football coach
 Eddie J. Lambert (b. 1956), Louisiana politician
 Edie Lambert (b. 1968), American television journalist
 Eleanor Lambert (1903–2003), American fashion pioneer
 Eleanor Lambert (cricketer) (d. 1994), South Africa and Natal Test cricketer
 Elizabeth Lambert, maiden name of Jane Shore (c. 1445–c. 1527), mistress of King Edward IV
 Elizabeth Lambert, pen name of contemporary author Penelope Williamson
 Emmanuelle Lambert (born 1975), French writer
 Eric Lambert (author) (1918–1966), Australian author
 Eric Lambert (English footballer) (1920–1979), English footballer
 Eric Lambert (Belgian footballer) (1936–2020), Belgian footballer
 Erwin Lambert (1909–1976), Nazi SS officer and Holocaust perpetrator
 Eugene Lambert (fl. 1960–1990), Irish puppeteer

F
 Francis Lambert (c. 1486–1530), French Protestant theologian
 Francis E. Lambert (1860–1924), American politician and lawyer
 Frank Lambert (disambiguation):
 Frank L. Lambert (born 1918), professor emeritus of chemistry at Occidental College, Los Angeles
 Franklin T. Lambert (fl.1990), professor of history at Purdue University
 Frank Lambert (curator), Director of the Walker Art Gallery, Liverpool, 1933 to 1953
 Frank Lambert (inventor) (1851–1937), French American inventor
 Frank Lambert (American football) (born 1943), American football punter
 Franz Lambert (b. 1948), German composer and organist

G
 Gary Lambert (politician), American politician
 Garry Lambert, contemporary Australian politician
 Gavin Lambert (1924–2005) British American screenwriter, novelist and biographer
 Geert Lambert (b. 1968), Belgian politician
 Geoffrey Lambert, Progressive Conservative Party candidate in the 2000 Canadian federal election
 George Lambert (disambiguation), any of several people of the same name
 Gordon Lambert (1919–2005), Irish art collector
 Graham Lambert, member of the band Inspiral Carpets
 Grant Lambert (b. 1977), Australian cricketer
 Greg Lambert (disambiguation)
 Gustave Lambert (1824– 71), French hydrographer and navigator

H
 Ham Lambert (1910–2006), Irish cricketer and Rugby Union player
 Hans Lambert (1928–unknown), Austrian chess player
 Harold Lambert (disambiguation), any of several people of the same name
 Harry Lambert (1918–1995), Australian cricketer
 Henri Lambert (1872–1934), Belgian engineer and glass works owner

I
 Isaac Cowley Lambert (1850–1909), British solicitor and Conservative Member of Parliament.

J
 Jack Lambert (disambiguation), any of several people of the same name
 Jacques Lambert (1891–1947), French architect
 Jane Lambert, maiden name of Jane Shore (c. 1445–c. 1527), mistress of King Edward IV of England
 Janet Lambert (1893–1973), American playwright
 Jason Lambert (b. 1977), American mixed martial artist
 Jean Lambert (b. 1950), politician
 Jenna Lambert (born 1991), Canadian disabled swimmer
 Jérôme Lambert (b. 1957), French politician
 Jerry Lambert (disambiguation), any of several people of the same name
 Jim Lambert, American sportswriter
 Johann Heinrich Lambert (1728–1777), Swiss polymath
 John Lambert (disambiguation), any of several people of the same name
 John Lambert of Creg Clare (1645 – c.1669),  Irish soldier and Royalist
 Johnny Woodly Lambert (born 1980), Costa Rican footballer
 Joseph Charles Lambert (known as J. C. Lambert) (c. 1803–1875), English comic actor who had a significant career in Australia
 Joseph-François Lambert, (1824–1873), French adventurer and diplomat
 Joseph Malet Lambert (1853–1931), English Canon of York
 Joyce Lambert (1916–2005), English botanist and stratigrapher

K
 Karel Lambert (b. 1928), philosopher and logician
 Karl Lambert (1815–1865), Russian general
 Kathy Lambert, contemporary American politician
 Ken Lambert (1928–2002), English footballer
 Kent Lambert, contemporary American politician
 Kit Lambert (1935–1981), English record producer

L
 Lane Lambert (b. 1964), Canadian ice hockey player
 Laura Lambert, alternate name of Russian spy Elena Miller
 Lillian Lincoln Lambert (fl. 1967–2001), American businesswoman
 Lisa Lambert, Canadian actress, writer and composer
 Lisa Lambert (politician), Canadian politician
 Lisa Michelle Lambert, an American convicted murderer
 Louis Lambert (b. 1940), American politician
 Rev. Dr. Louis A. Lambert (1835–1910), Irish-American cleric, newspaper publisher and Volapükologists
 Lucien-Léon Guillaume Lambert, French pianist and composer.

M
 Marcel Lambert (1919–2000), Canadian politician
 Marie Lambert (1935–1961), Swiss motorcycle racer
 Margaret Bergmann Lambert (1914–2017), German athlete
 Marjorie F. Lambert (1908–2006), American anthropologist and archaeologist
 Mark Lambert (disambiguation), any of several people of the same name
 Mary Lambert (director) (b. 1951), American director
 Mary Lambert (singer) (b. 1989), American singer-songwriter
 Mayer Lambert (1863–1930), French orientalist
 Melanie Lambert and Fred Palascak (b. 1974 and 1975 respectively), pair ice skating team
 Mercedes Lambert, pseudonym of Douglas Anne Munson (1948–2004), attorney, teacher and writer
 Michael Lambert (disambiguation), any of several people of the same name
 Michelle Lambert (b. 1985), American pop singer
 Michel Lambert (1610–1696), French singing master, theorbist and composer
 Mick Lambert (b. 1950), British football player
 Mieszko II Lambert (990–1034), king of Poland
 Miranda Lambert (b. 1983), American country music singer
 Moy Lambert (1550–1625), Dutch vice admiral

N
 Nadine Lambert (1926–2006), American psychology professor
 Nathalie Lambert (b. 1963), Canadian short-track speed skater
 Neal E. Lambert (b. 1934), American professor of literature
 Nicolas-Eustache Lambert Dumont (1767–1835), Canadian seigneur
 Nigel Lambert (born 1944), British actor
 Norman Platt Lambert (1885–1965), Canadian politician

P
 Paul Lambert (disambiguation), any of several people of the same name
 Paula Lambert (b. 1943), American cook
 Pee Wee Lambert (1924–1965), American mandolinist
 Percy E. Lambert (1881–1913), car racer, first person to cover a hundred miles in an hour
 Peter Lambert, any of several people with this name
 Phyllis Lambert (b. 1927), Canadian millionaire and philanthropist
 Pierre Lambert (1920–2008), French trotskyist
 Pierre Lambert de la Motte (1624–1679), French bishop and founding member of the Paris Foreign Missions Society
 Piggy Lambert (1888–1958), American basketball coach

R
 Rachel Lambert Mellon (b. 1910), American philanthropist and art collector
 Rae Lambert, 20th century British author
 Raoul Lambert (b. 1944), Belgian football player
 Ray Lambert (b. 1922), Welsh football player
 Raymond Lambert (1914–1997), Swiss climber
 Rickie Lambert (b. 1982), English football player
 Richard Lambert (b. 1944), British businessman
 Richard Lambert (handballer) (b. 1948), Canadian handball player
 Richard S. Lambert (1894–1981), Canadian author
 Robert-Hugues Lambert (1908–1945), French actor
 Rudy Lambert (fl. 1940s), American member of the California Communist Party

S
 S. H. Lambert, pen name of British writer Stephen Southwold (1887–1964)
 Samuel M. Lambert (1914–1991), American president of the National Education Association
 Sarah Lambert (b. 1970), Australian actor and producer
 Scrappy Lambert (1901–1987), American jazz band vocalist
 Sep Lambert (1876–1959), Irish cricketer
 Sheela Lambert (b. 1956), American civil rights activist
 Simon Lambert (disambiguation), any of several people of the same name
 Stephen Lambert (disambiguation), any of several people of the same name
 Steve Lambert (artist) (b. 1976), American artist

T
 Thomas Lambert (disambiguation), any of several people with this name
 Tony Lambert, 20th century British diplomat

V
 Verity Lambert (1935–2007), British television producer

W
 Ward Lambert (1888–1958), American college basketball coach
 Wilfred G. Lambert (1926–2011), British archaeologist
 William Lambert (disambiguation), any of several people of the same name

Y
 Yumi Lambert (b. 1995), Belgian fashion model
 Yves Lambert (b. 1936), French aerospace engineer
 Yvon Lambert (b. 1950), Canadian ice hockey player
 Yvonne Lambert, member of the band The Octopus Project

In British peerage
 Viscount Lambert, British peerage title created in 1945
 Lambert Baronets, British baronetage title created in 1711

Fictional characters
 Alfred, Chip, Denise, Enid, and Gary Lambert, characters in Jonathan Franzen's 2001 novel "The Corrections"
 Darien Lambert, main character of the series Time Trax
 Eve Lambert, character from the American television series Port Charles
 Garrett Lambert, character from the American television series Community
 Irving Lambert, a major character in the Splinter Cell franchise
 Lambert Strether, character from Henry James's 1903 novel The Ambassadors
 Val Lambert, character from the British soap opera Emmerdale
 Chuck Lambert, character from Season 1 episode 4 ("Phantom Traveller") of "Supernatural"
 Joan Lambert, character from the 1979 film Alien
 Mr Lambert, Walters White’s fake identity in Breaking Bad
 Lambert, character from the 2022 game Cult of the Lamb

See also
 Lambert (musician) (disambiguation)
 Lamberg
 Lambertus
 Lampert
 Lamprecht (surname)

References

External links

 The Lambert Surname (part of the Lambert DNA Project site)

English-language surnames
Surnames of Belgian origin
Surnames of Dutch origin
Surnames of Norman origin
Surnames of French origin
French-language surnames
Germanic-language surnames
Patronymic surnames
Dutch masculine given names
Surnames from given names